Diego Alende López (born 25 August 1997) is a Spanish footballer who plays as a central defender for FC Andorra.

Club career

Celta Vigo 
Born in Santiago de Compostela, Galicia, Alende played youth football with local Celta de Vigo, signing a new five-year deal on 11 August 2015. He made his senior debut with the B-team on 20 September of that year, starting in a 6–1 home routing of Arandina CF in the Segunda División B championship.

Alende made his first team – and La Liga – debut on 5 December 2015, coming on as a second-half substitute for goalscorer Theo Bongonda in a 1–1 away draw against Real Betis. He resumed his spell at the club mainly with the B-team, leaving on 19 June 2019.

Real Valladolid 
On 4 July 2019, Alende moved to another reserve team, Real Valladolid B also in division three. He made his debut with the main squad the following 22 January, starting in a 1–2 loss at CD Tenerife for the season's Copa del Rey.

Loan to Lugo 
On 20 August 2020, Alende was loaned to Segunda División side CD Lugo, for one year. On 22 July of the following year, he renewed his contract with the Blanquivioletas until 2023 and was loaned to Lugo for a further season.

Andorra 
On 14 July 2022, Alende joined FC Andorra on a two-year contract.

References

External links

1997 births
Living people
Spanish footballers
Association football defenders
La Liga players
Segunda División players
Segunda División B players
Celta de Vigo B players
RC Celta de Vigo players
Real Valladolid Promesas players
Real Valladolid players
CD Lugo players
FC Andorra players
Spain youth international footballers
Footballers from Santiago de Compostela